Familiar Spirits is a memoir published in 2000 by American writer Alison Lurie.  In it, she recounts a friendship with poet James Merrill and his life partner David Jackson which began in the 1950s.

Merrill and Jackson were both wealthy, well-educated men, who lived an openly gay life decades before that was common.  Together, the two men spent many years gathering Ouija board messages during séances, a fact of which Lurie was made aware of early on, and about which she never lost her early skepticism.  For Merrill, the poetic result was a 560-page apocalyptic epic called The Changing Light at Sandover (1982), which is in large measure transcribed from supernatural voices. In Familiar Spirits, Lurie attempts to provide several rational and mundane explanations for Merrill and Jackson's epiphanies and revelations.

2000 non-fiction books
Literary autobiographies